This is a list of Portuguese winter football transfers for the 2015–16 season. The winter transfer window opened on 1 January 2016 and closed on 31 January 2016. Players could be bought before the transfer window opened, but could not join their new clubs until 1 January. Additionally, players without a club could join at any time and clubs were able to sign a goalkeeper on an emergency loan if they had no registered goalkeeper available. Only moves involving Primeira Liga clubs are listed. This list includes transfers featuring Primeira Liga clubs which completed transfers after the closing of the summer 2015 transfer window due to other domestic leagues having a later closure date to their transfer window.

Transfers

 Some players may have been bought after the end of the 2015 summer transfer window in Portugal but before the end of that country's transfer window closed.

References

2015–16 in Portuguese football
Football transfers winter 2015–16
Lists of Portuguese football transfers